Marián Kuřeja (born 30 July 1980) is a Slovak Paralympic athlete competing in F51-classification club throw and discus throw events. He is a two-time bronze medalist in the men's club throw F51 event at the Summer Paralympics.

He represented Slovakia at the 2016 Summer Paralympics in Rio de Janeiro, Brazil and he won the bronze medal in the men's club throw F51 event. He qualified to represent Slovakia at the 2020 Summer Paralympics in Tokyo, Japan after finishing in 4th place in the men's club throw F51 event at the 2019 World Para Athletics Championships held in Dubai, United Arab Emirates. He won the bronze medal in the men's club throw F51 event.

At the 2017 World Para Athletics Dubai Grand Prix, he won the silver medal in the men's discus throw F51/52 event.

At the 2018 World Para Athletics European Championships held in Berlin, Germany, he won the silver medal in the men's club throw F51 event.

References

External links 
 

Living people
1980 births
Athletes (track and field) at the 2016 Summer Paralympics
Athletes (track and field) at the 2020 Summer Paralympics
Medalists at the 2016 Summer Paralympics
Medalists at the 2020 Summer Paralympics
Paralympic bronze medalists for Slovakia
Paralympic medalists in athletics (track and field)
Paralympic athletes of Slovakia
Slovak male discus throwers
Club throwers
Sportspeople from Banská Bystrica
20th-century Slovak people
21st-century Slovak people